Julio Dalmao (born 5 May 1940) is a Uruguayan former footballer. He played in eleven matches for the Uruguay national football team from 1959 and 1968. He was also part of Uruguay's squad for the 1959 South American Championship that took place in Ecuador.

References

External links
 

1940 births
Living people
Uruguayan footballers
Uruguay international footballers
Place of birth missing (living people)
Association football defenders
C.A. Cerro players
Club Atlético Vélez Sarsfield footballers
Huracán Buceo players
Club Nacional de Football players
C.A. Rentistas players
Uruguayan expatriate footballers
Expatriate footballers in Argentina
Expatriate soccer players in the United States